Richard Ward, 32, was fatally shot on 22 February 2022 by Pueblo County sheriff deputy Charles McWhorter during an incident in Liberty Point International Middle School in Pueblo West, Colorado. 

Richard Ward was questioned by the police after being observed attempting to enter a car that was not his in the middle school's parking lot. The tone of the conversation shifted dramatically after Ward was asked for his identification, if he had any weapons on his person and appeared to put an anti-anxiety pill in his mouth, which was followed by McWhorter, one of two deputies at the scene, dragging Ward out of the car and throwing him to the ground, shortly before shooting him three times in the chest.

After reviewing the results, District Attorney Jeff Chostner determined that the deputies' actions were rational and "justified" because they "believed their lives or the lives of others were in jeopardy". On 17 February 2023, McWhorter earned a Purple Heart award from the Pueblo County Sheriff's Office for allegedly sustaining injuries during the incident. On 21 February 2023, Ward's family filed a federal lawsuit against McWhorter and his agency.

Killing 
According to the report by the district attorney CIT, Richard Ward arrived with his mother Kristy Ward and her boyfriend Tommy Brown to the school, to pick up his brother from middle school. Richard went for a smoke in the lot and was seen trying to get into a vehicle that was not his. He was confronted by school staff and was told to leave the premises. Tommy yelled at him to come back to the car.

According to the report by the district attorney CIT, deputies were dispatched on a report that a "suspicious" individual was in the middle school's parking lot, trying to get into cars, became "aggressive" and was possibly "on something". The deputies arrived at the scene shortly after that and approached the suspect sitting in the rear passenger seat of a white SUV. Richard identified himself and gave the deputies his version of events, saying that he had confused the vehicle for his mother's white SUV and apologized to the driver.

The tone of the conversation shifted dramatically after Ward was asked for his identification and if he had any weapons on his person. Ward appeared to put a pill into his mouth, which was followed by McWhorter, one of two deputies at the scene, pulling Ward out of the car. A brief physical altercation ensued culminating with McWhorter shooting him three times in the chest.

Body camera footage 
The bodycam footage of the incident was released by the family's attorney. Ward can be seen in the footage sitting in the rear seat of a white SUV, explaining to officers that he had mistakenly tried to enter another vehicle. The body camera footage shows Ward saying he was not comfortable around law enforcement officers since excessive force had previously been used against him.

Ward is seen explaining to the officer what happened when he entered the wrong car. He emptied his pockets when Charles McWhorter, the Pueblo County sheriff deputy, demanded his identification. Ward also said he might have a pocketknife. Then he pulled a pill out of his pocket and placed it in his mouth, after which the tone of the conversation shifted dramatically. "What did you just stick in your mouth?" McWhorter asked Ward. Then, without waiting for Ward to respond, McWhorter dragged Ward out of the car and tossed him to the ground Ward responded that "it was a pill."  McWhorter and another officer, Cassandra Gonzales, struggle on the ground for a few seconds, after which three gunshots could be heard in the footage. McWhorter and his partner confirmed with each other that the other was fine. McWhorter told Gonzales that Ward headbutted him in the nose and "tried to grab my stuff". Neither of them administered aid to Ward lying wounded in the snow. Ward was declared dead at the site.

Aftermath 
McWhorter, the deputy who fatally shot Richard Ward three times in the chest, subsequently stated that he thought Ward was reaching for his gun. According to the report by the district attorney CIT, it was revealed that Richard possessed no weapon and autopsy found a prescription anti-anxiety pill in his pocket. In October 2022, Colorado's 10th Judicial District Attorney J.E. Chostner, eventually ruled that McWhorter's shooting of Ward was justified.

Ward's mother, Kristy Ward Stamp, said the loss had "broken" her heart. Ward's mother and the defense attorney for his family showed their disgust at how the Pueblo sheriff's office handled Richard Ward's killing. "This was nothing short of state-sanctioned murder of a citizen who should not have been arrested, let alone killed in broad daylight," said the Ward family's attorney, Darold Killmer, in a statement according to the Washington Post.

Award to the deputy 
On 17 February 2023, Charles McWhorter was awarded a purple heart by the Pueblo County Sheriff's Office for allegedly sustaining injuries to his forehead, fingers, back, knee, and neck while shooting Richard Ward three times at close range, killing him on February 22, 2022. He was awarded four days before Ward's family launched a wrongful death case against him and his organization in federal court. The family attorney stated that Ward's family were not aware of the award when they filed the complaint. Killmer added that the award was "truly a brazen act which mocks the very purpose of a Purple Heart".

Lawsuit 
Ward's family opened "a federal civil rights lawsuit alleging improper use of force" on 21 February 2023. The complaint also challenges the arrest of Ward's mother and her boyfriend, seizure of their property and their subsequent interrogation.

See also 

 Killing of Tyre Nichols
 List of school shootings in the United States (2000–present)

References 

2022 controversies in the United States
2022 deaths
2023 controversies in the United States
February 2022 events in the United States
Filmed killings by law enforcement
Killings by law enforcement officers in the United States
Law enforcement controversies in the United States
Law enforcement in Colorado
Middle school shootings in the United States
People shot dead by law enforcement officers in the United States
School shootings in the United States
Incidents of violence against men